Glogovo is a village in Croatia.

Population

According to the 2011 census, Glogovo had 11 inhabitants.

Napomena: In 1857 and 1869 data is include in the settlements of Gračac and Kijani, and in 1880 part of data is include in the settlement of Kijani.

1991 census

According to the 1991 census, settlement of Glogovo had 66 inhabitants, which were ethnically declared as this:

Austro-hungarian 1910 census

According to the 1910 census, settlement of Glogovo had 460 inhabitants in 2 hamlets, which were linguistically and religiously declared as this:

Literature 

  Savezni zavod za statistiku i evidenciju FNRJ i SFRJ, popis stanovništva 1948, 1953, 1961, 1971, 1981. i 1991. godine.
 Knjiga: "Narodnosni i vjerski sastav stanovništva Hrvatske, 1880–1991: po naseljima, author: Jakov Gelo, izdavač: Državni zavod za statistiku Republike Hrvatske, 1998., ;

References

External links

Populated places in Zadar County
Lika
Serb communities in Croatia